Aliza T. Greenblatt is an American mechanical engineer and author of speculative fiction who writes as A. T. Greenblatt. to avoid confusion with poet Aliza Greenblatt.

Life
Greenblatt attended the School of Engineering at the University of Delaware in Newark, Delaware. where in 2007 she received the Engineering Alumni Association Scholarship, a scholarship "presented to junior engineering students who demonstrate academic excellence, community service, and professional development. She lives in the Philadelphia area and "is a mechanical engineer by day and a writer by night."
Greenblatt describes her interests as reading, listening to music, cooking, baking, watching movies, gaming, traveling, and working out.

Writing career
Greenblatt has been active as an author since 2011. She is a graduate of the writing workshops Viable Paradise XVI and Clarion West 2017, and has been an editorial assistant at flash fiction magazines Every Day Fiction and Flash Fiction Online.

Her work has appeared in various periodicals, anthologies and podcasts, including 
The Absent Willow Review, Asimov's Science Fiction, Aurora Wolf, Beneath Ceaseless Skies, Broad Knowledge: 35 Women Up To No Good, Buzzy Mag, Clarkesworld Magazine, Daily Science Fiction, Disabled People Destroy Science Fiction, Escape Pod, Flash Fiction Chronicles, Flash Fiction Online, flashquake, Fireside, Girls With Insurance, Lightspeed, Mothership Zeta, Mythic Delirium, One Forty Fiction, One-Sentence Mini Anthology, Pantheon Magazine, PodCastle, Short, Fast, and Deadly, Strange Horizons, Textofiction, Thrillers, Killers, 'n' Chillers, Trapeze Magazine, and Uncanny Magazine.

Bibliography

Short stories

Nonfiction

Awards
"A Non-Hero's Guide to The Road of Monsters" was a finalist for the 2018 Parsec Award for Best Speculative Fiction Story: Small Cast (Short Form).
"And Yet" was nominated for the 2018 Nebula Award for Best Short Story and placed twentieth in the 2019 Locus Poll Award for Best Short Story. "Give the Family My Love" won the 2019 Nebula Award for Best Short Story and was a finalist for the 2020 Theodore Sturgeon Award. Her novelette "Burn or the Episodic Life of Sam Wells as Super" was a finalist for the 2020 Nebula Award and the 2021 Hugo Award for Best Novelette.

References

Living people
21st-century American women writers
American speculative fiction writers
Nebula Award winners
Year of birth missing (living people)
Place of birth missing (living people)